Allenc is a commune in the Lozère department in southern France. The triple divide between the Gironde, Loire, and Rhône basins lies within the commune.

Population

See also
Communes of the Lozère department

References

Communes of Lozère